The Entry/Exit System (EES) is a large-scale IT system of the European Union for the automatic monitoring of the border-crossing of third-country nationals (non-EU/EEA/Swiss citizens). Envisioned to replace passport stamps, the system will be installed at the external border crossing points of the Schengen Area, e.g. airports and seaports. As of July 2022, EES was scheduled to enter into operation at the end of May 2023, however this was later delayed to the end of 2023.

Function

The task of EES is to collect data of border-crossing of third-country nationals at the external border of the EU and to abolish passport stamps. Collected data will include the name and date of birth of the traveller, as well as dates of entry and exit into/from the Schengen Area. Beside these alphanumeric data points, it is planned to store biometric data like pictures and fingerprints.

Operation

EES will be operated by the EU's IT agency eu-LISA. The system launch was originally scheduled for 2020. As of July 2022, the planned date for the entry into operation of EES was the end of May 2023, however this was later delayed to the end of 2023.

European Union Regulations 

 Regulation (EU) 2017/2226 of the European Parliament and of the Council of 30 November 2017 establishing an Entry/Exit System (EES) to register entry and exit data and refusal of entry data of third-country nationals crossing the external borders of the Member States and determining the conditions for access to the EES for law enforcement purposes, and amending the Convention implementing the Schengen Agreement and Regulations (EC) No 767/2008 and (EU) No 1077/2011 (OJ L 327, 9 December 2017, p. 20)
 Regulation (EU) 2017/2225 of the European Parliament and of the Council of 30 November 2017 amending Regulation (EU) 2016/399 as regards the use of the Entry/Exit System (OJ L 327, 9 December 2017, p. 1)

See also 
eu-LISA
 European Travel Information and Authorisation System

References 

Biometric databases
Government databases of the European Union
Law enforcement in Europe
Information System